The Academy of Arts ( / ) is a private higher education institution in Belgrade, Serbia. It was founded in 1994, by Aleksandar Pantelić, Velimir Abramović and Milan Đoković.

References

External links
  Official Website

Universities and colleges in Serbia
Education in Belgrade
1994 establishments in Serbia